The Chilean Revolution of 1859 was the second attempt by the Chilean Liberals to overthrow their country's Conservative government. Like the first attempt in 1851, it ended in failure. 5,000 people were killed during the fighting.

Battle of Los Loros
On March 14, 1859, the Liberal rebels defeated a government force at La Serena, killing 60 government soldiers, wounding 100 and taking 250 prisoner. In addition, they captured 4 pieces of artillery, while their own losses were 40 killed.

Battle of Maipón
On April 12, 1859, government forces and Liberal rebels clashed in Chillán Viejo. 20 rebels and 13 government soldiers were killed and 70 rebels and 55 government soldiers were wounded. 300 rebels were taken prisoner by the government.

Battle of Cerro Grande
On April 29, 1859, a government army of 3,000 soldiers defeated a rebel force of less than 2,000 in La Serena; killing 100 rebels and capturing another 500 as well as all of the rebel artillery pieces. 50 government soldiers were killed.

References

Bibliography
 Encina, Francisco Antonio, y Leopoldo Castedo (2006). Historia de Chile. Consolidación del Régimen Conservador. Tomo VI. Santiago de Chile: Editorial Santiago. . 
 Ortega Martínez, Luis, y Pablo Rubio Apiolaza (2006). "La guerra civil de 1859 y los límites de la modernización de Atacama y Coquimbo". Revista de Historia Social y Mentalidades. Santiago de Chile: Departamento de Historia de la Universidad de Santiago de Chile. No. X. Vol. 2: 11-39. ISSN 0717-5248.

External links
La Revolución Constituyente de 1859, de Guillermo Cortés Lutz
La Revolución de 1859 en Memoria Chilena
Antecedentes de la Revolución
Gobierno de Manuel Montt

Conflicts in 1859
Revolutions in Chile
Wars involving Chile
1859 in Chile